Moffat Rugby Football Club (abbreviated as Moffat RFC) and known as The Rams are a rugby union side, currently playing in the .

The team is based in Moffat in south-west Scotland, and they play at Holm Park.

History
Founded in 1994, the club is named "The Rams" after the statue in the High Street which commemorates Moffat's connections with the wool trade. The ground is situated at The Holm, Selkirk Road and is wholly owned by the club.

1st XV senior training takes place on Tuesday and Thursdays at 7pm, at Holm Park.

Cammy Little of the Rams won the Glasgow Warriors Community Hero of the 2021–22 season.

Honours
 Scottish Rugby Union West Division Four 2014–15 Champions

Notable former players
 Roy Laidlaw
 Alex Dunbar

References

Rugby union in Dumfries and Galloway
Scottish rugby union teams
Rugby clubs established in 1995
1995 establishments in Scotland
Moffat